Salah El-Din Fatih (born 15 March 1924) was an Egyptian boxer. He competed in the men's featherweight event at the 1952 Summer Olympics.

References

External links
 

1924 births
Possibly living people
Egyptian male boxers
Olympic boxers of Egypt
Boxers at the 1952 Summer Olympics
Place of birth missing
Featherweight boxers
20th-century Egyptian people